Yinxiang may refer to:

Yinxiang, Prince Yi (胤祥; 1686 — 1730), a prince of the Qing dynasty
Yinxiang (magazine), a 1971–1998 Taiwanese film journal
Yinxiang Group, an industrial company based in Chongqing, China, specializing in real estate and research, development, manufacturing and sales of motorcycles, passenger vehicles, gasoline engines and general-purpose engines and equipment.
Yinxiang Motorcycle (银翔摩托), mainland Chinese company based in Chongqing
Yinxiang (town) (殷巷镇), town in Shanghe County, Shandong, China